Taryn Swiatek (born February 4, 1981 in Calgary, Alberta) is a retired Canadian professional soccer player. Swiatek played as goalkeeper for the Canada national team, which placed fourth in the FIFA Women's World Cup competition in 2003.
She also joined with the Ottawa Fury soccer team in the W-League. Swiatek formally announced her retirement from the game of soccer in late January 2008.

Education
After graduating from Western Canada High School Swiatek attended the University of Calgary, where she played on the Dino's soccer team. She played for the Dinos from 1999 to 2001 and sat out the 2002 season with a knee injury.

References

1981 births
Living people
Soccer players from Calgary
Canadian women's soccer players
Canada women's international soccer players
2003 FIFA Women's World Cup players
2007 FIFA Women's World Cup players
Calgary Dinos soccer players
People educated at Western Canada High School
Women's association football goalkeepers
Pan American Games silver medalists for Canada
Pan American Games bronze medalists for Canada
Pan American Games medalists in football
Footballers at the 2003 Pan American Games
Footballers at the 2007 Pan American Games
Medalists at the 2003 Pan American Games
Medalists at the 2007 Pan American Games
Ottawa Fury (women) players
USL W-League (1995–2015) players
Fortuna Hjørring players
Expatriate women's footballers in Denmark
Canadian expatriate sportspeople in Denmark